Calling is Kobukuro's eighth album under Warner Music Japan, released on August 5, 2009. The song "Sayonara Hero" was written by Kentaro Kobuchi as a tribute to Kiyoshiro Imawano.

Track listing

 Sayonara HERO (サヨナラ HERO)
 Koigokoro (恋心)
 To calling of love
 Niji (虹)
 STAY
 Tenshitachi no Uta (天使達の歌)
 FREEDOM TRAIN
 Summer rain
 Sunday kitchen
 Kamikaze (神風)
 Betelgeuse (ベテルギウス)
 Toki no Ashioto (時の足音)
 Akai Ito (赤い糸)

References 

2009 albums
Kobukuro albums
Warner Music Japan albums